is a platform video game, part of the Mega Man Battle Network subseries of Mega Man video games. The game was released on the WonderSwan Color, only in Japan. This game is a platformer like Mega Man Network Transmission, rather than a role-playing game.

Reception
Rockman EXE WS was scored a total of 26 out of 40 from a panel of four reviewers in the Japanese Famitsu magazine. Lucas M. Thomas and Craig Harris of IGN preferred this unlocalized game over the card-based Mega Man Battle Chip Challenge, which was released on the WonderSwan and on the Game Boy Advance in Western territories. 1UP.com's Jeremy Parish agreed Rockman EXE WS was better, but still called it "a pretty terrible excuse for a Mega Man game, similar in concept to Network Transmission, but indescribably worse."

References

External links
Rockman EXE WS at the WonderSwan Channel 

2003 video games
Japan-exclusive video games
WS
Platform games
Video games developed in Japan
WonderSwan Color games